The Men's junior race at the 2017 UCI Cyclo-cross World Championships was held on 28 January 2017 in Bieles, Luxembourg. Contenders had to be male and born in 1999 or 2000. It was won by one of the race favourites Tom Pidcock of Great Britain ahead of two compatriots.

Race report
The weeks before the race temperatures had been below zero causing the soil to be frozen and slight rain the night and morning before the race caused the track to be extremely icy and slippery. This was evident right at the start as several riders took a tumble in the first turn, holding up about half the pack.

The first lap saw Maxime Bonsergent of France take an early lead, chased by a small group involving Jelle Camps, Toon Vandebosch, Ben Turner, Antoine Benoist and pre-race favorite Tom Pidcock. Pidcock was the only one succeeding to bridge the gap to Bonsergent and together they built up a lead while the rest of the pack quickly spread out and most riders were cycling alone. Already at the end of the second lap, Pidcock had broken away and built up a gap of more than 20 seconds over Bonsergent who had been caught by Ben Turner. Timo Kielich was also in the chasing group but fell hard and dropped outside the top 10. This left the group of Antoine Benoist, Loris Rouiller and Dan Tulett racing for fourth place, another 20 seconds behind Turner and Bonsergent.

Pidcock maintained and extended his lead during the race, never coming in real trouble an easily taking the victory. In the battle for the medals, Bonsergent dropped out as he fell several times and eventually after breaking his derailleur gears and losing a shoe he had to run back to the pits and would eventually finish in 20th place. Tulett caught Turner by the end of lap three and they battled it out for the remaining two medals with Tulett taking the silver in the end. Louis Rouiller came close to both British riders on the final lap but finally came eight seconds short of bronze.

Results

References

External links

Men's junior race
UCI Cyclo-cross World Championships – Men's junior race